Stefan Edberg was the defending champion but lost in the final 6–4, 6–2, 6–4 to Goran Ivanišević.

Seeds
All sixteen seeds received a bye to the second round.

  Stefan Edberg (final)
  Goran Ivanišević (champion)
  Andre Agassi (third round)
  Ivan Lendl (quarterfinals)
  Wayne Ferreira (third round)
  Richard Krajicek (semifinals)
  John McEnroe (quarterfinals)
  Wally Masur (third round)
  Paul Haarhuis (quarterfinals)
  Derrick Rostagno (second round)
  David Wheaton (second round)
  Henrik Holm (semifinals)
  Todd Woodbridge (second round)
  Mark Woodforde (third round)
  Richey Reneberg (third round)
  Shuzo Matsuoka (second round)

Draw

Finals

Top half

Section 1

Section 2

Bottom half

Section 3

Section 4

External links
 1992 Australian Indoor Championships draw

Singles